Street Spies is a Hardy Boys novel in the Casefiles series. It was published in 1988.

Plot summary
Frank and Joe head to New York to pose as bike messengers. They hear of "computer secrets" being stolen by cyberspace thieves, and they hear of a renegade messenger out to destroy the Hardys. They must find a lead, before it becomes too much.

References

The Hardy Boys books
1988 American novels
1988 children's books
Novels set in New York City